Hyacinthus  is a small genus of bulbous, spring-blooming perennials. They are fragrant flowering plants in the family Asparagaceae, subfamily Scilloideae and are commonly called hyacinths. The genus is native to the area of the eastern Mediterranean from the south of Turkey to Palestine, although naturalized more widely.

Several species of Brodiaea, Scilla, and other plants that were formerly classified in the Liliaceae family and have flower clusters borne along the stalk also have common names with the word "hyacinth" in them. Hyacinths should also not be confused with the genus Muscari, which are commonly known as grape hyacinths.

Description
Hyacinthus grows from bulbs, each producing around four to six linear leaves and one to three spikes or racemes of flowers. Cultivars of H. orientalis have much denser flower spikes and are generally more robust.

Systematics
The genus name Hyacinthus was attributed to Joseph Pitton de Tournefort when used by Carl Linnaeus in 1753. The original wild plant known as hyakinthos to Homer has been identified with Scilla bifolia, among other possibilities. Linnaeus defined the genus Hyacinthus widely to include species now placed in other genera of the subfamily Scilloideae, such as Muscari (e.g. his Hyacinthus botryoides) and Hyacinthoides (e.g. his Hyacinthus non-scriptus).

Hyacinthus was formerly the type genus of the separate family Hyacinthaceae; prior to that, the genus was placed in the lily family Liliaceae.

Species
Three species are placed within the genus Hyacinthus:
 Hyacinthus litwinovii
 Hyacinthus orientalis - common, Dutch or garden hyacinth
 Hyacinthus transcaspicus

Some authorities place H. litwonovii and H. transcaspicus in the related genus Hyacinthella, which would make Hyacinthus a monotypic genus.

Distribution
The genus Hyacinthus is considered native to the eastern Mediterranean from southern Turkey to north Israel, including Turkey, Turkmenistan, Iran, Iraq, Lebanon, Syria, and the region of Palestine. It is widely naturalized elsewhere, including Europe (the Netherlands, France, Sardinia, Italy, Sicily, Croatia, Serbia, Montenegro, Bulgaria, North Macedonia, Albania, Greece and Cyprus), Korea, North America (United States and Canada) and central Mexico, Cuba and Haiti.

Cultivation
The Dutch, or common hyacinth of house and garden culture (H. orientalis, native to Southwest Asia) was so popular in the 18th century that over 2,000 cultivars were grown in the Netherlands, its chief commercial producer. This hyacinth has a single dense spike of fragrant flowers in shades of red, blue, white, orange, pink, violet or yellow. A form of the common hyacinth is the less hardy and smaller blue- or white-petalled Roman hyacinth of florists. These flowers need indirect sunlight and should be watered moderately.

Toxicity
Hyacinth bulbs are poisonous; they contain oxalic acid. Handling hyacinth bulbs can cause mild skin irritation. Protective gloves are recommended.

Some members of the plant subfamily Scilloideae are commonly called hyacinths but are not members of the genus Hyacinthus and are edible; one example is the tassel hyacinth, which forms part of the cuisine of some Mediterranean countries.

Culture

Hyacinths are often associated with spring and rebirth. The hyacinth flower is used in the Haft-Seen table setting for the Persian New Year celebration, Nowruz, held at the spring equinox.

The name  was used in Ancient Greece for at least two distinct plants, which have variously been identified as Scilla bifolia or Orchis quadripunctata and Consolida ajacis (larkspur). Plants known by this name were sacred to Aphrodite. According to Greek mythology, the flower was created by the god Apollo in commemoration of his lover Hyacinthus, whom he had accidentally killed, and who was worshipped as a hero at Amyclae, southwest of Sparta.

The hyacinth appears in the first section of T.S. Eliot's The Waste Land during a conversation between the narrator and the "hyacinth girl" that takes place in the spring.

In Roman Catholic tradition, Hyacinthus orientalis represents prudence, constancy, desire of heaven and peace of mind.

Gallery

Colour
The colour of the blue flower hyacinth plant varies between 'mid-blue', violet blue and bluish purple.  Within this range can be found Persenche, which is an American color name (probably from French), for a hyacinth hue.
The colour analysis of Persenche is 73% ultramarine, 9% red and 18% white.

See also
 Tekhelet - meaning "bluish violet" or "blue" in Hebrew, was translated as hyakinthos (Greek: ὑακίνθος, "hyacinth").

References

Further reading
 Coccoris, Patricia (2012) The Curious History of the Bulb Vase. Published by Cortex Design.

External links

 Hyacinth perennialization Research Newsletter Number 4. (October 2004) Flower Bulb Research Program Department of Horticulture, College of Agriculture and Life Sciences, Cornell University
 Grow up and blossoming of Hyacinth

Scilloideae
Asparagaceae genera
Flora of Central Asia
Garden plants of Asia
Taxa named by Joseph Pitton de Tournefort